Xanthippe's shrew (Crocidura xantippe) is a species of mammal in the family Soricidae. It is found in Kenya and Tanzania. Its natural habitats are dry savanna and subtropical or tropical dry shrubland.

References

Xanthippe's shrew
Mammals of Kenya
Mammals of Tanzania
Xanthippe's shrew
Taxonomy articles created by Polbot